Zakaria El Masbahi (born 3 March 1979) is a Moroccan basketball player currently playing for AS Salé in the Nationale 1.

Career
El Masbahi is a member of the Morocco national basketball team.
He was the leading scorer for Morocco at the 2009 FIBA Africa Championship, averaging 15.9 PPG for the tournament.  El Masbahi's best performance for the tournament came in the opener against Rwanda, where he scored 37 points in Morocco's 85-84 victory to help lead Morocco into the second round.

BAL career statistics

|-
| style="text-align:left;"|2021
| style="text-align:left;"|AS Salé
| 3 || 0 || 11.4 || .385 || .300 || 1.000 || .3 || 1.3 || 1.3 || .0 || 4.7
|-
|- class="sortbottom"
| style="text-align:center;" colspan="2"|Career
| 3 || 0 || 11.4 || .385 || .300 || 1.000 || .3 || 1.3 || 1.3 || .0 || 4.7

References

1979 births
Living people
Moroccan men's basketball players
People from Fez, Morocco
Point guards
Shooting guards
AS Salé (basketball) players